The Desulfuromonadales are an order within the Thermodesulfobacteriota. Various members of the Desulfomonadales are capable of anaerobic respiration utilizing a variety of compounds as electron acceptors, including sulfur, Mn(IV), Fe(III), nitrate, Co(III), Tc(VII), U(VI) and trichloroacetic acid

References

External links
 Geobacter Project